The Myrmecozelinae are a subfamily of moth of the family Tineidae.

Genera

 Ateliotum
 Analytarcha
 Cephimallota
 syn. Anemallota
 syn. Aphimallota
 syn. Cephitinea
 Cinnerethica
 Contralissa
 Coryptilum
 Criticonoma
 Dicanica
 Dinica
 Drosica
 Ellochotis
 Endromarmata
 Euagophleps
 Exoplisis
 Gerontha
 Haplotinea (tentatively placed here)
 Ippa
 Ischnuridia
 Janseana
 Machaeropteris
 Mesopherna
 Metapherna
 Mimoscopa
 Moerarchis
 Myrmecozela
 Pachyarthra
 Pararhodobates
 Phthoropoea
 Platysceptra
 Propachyarthra
 Rhodobates
 Sarocrania
 Scalmatica
 Timaea
 Tineovertex
 Tracheloteina

References